Essai variously means attempt, test, trial, or essay in French.

Essai may also refer to:

Essai, an alternative way of writing Yesai or Yessai (in Armenian Եսայի), an Armenian masculine given name 
Essai (coin), an alternative term for a pattern coin
Essaï Altounian, French Armenian singer and member of Genealogy, supergroup singing for Armenian in Eurovision Song Contest 2015
Essai sur le don, original title of The Gift by French sociologist Marcel Mauss that is the foundation of social theories of reciprocity and gift exchange

See also
Neauphe-sous-Essai, a commune in the Orne department in north-western France.
Studio d'Essai, later called Club d'Essai, founded in 1942 by Pierre Schaeffer, played a role in the activities of the French resistance during World War II, and later became a center of musical activity